John Davidson (August 31, 1924 – August 21, 2012) was an American politician.

Born in West Point, Mississippi, Davidson graduated from Petersburg, Illinois High School. Davidson served in the Illinois Senate 1973–1993. He served in the United States Navy Air Corp during World War II and was a chiropractor. He served on the Sangamon County, Illinois Board and was chairman of the board prior to being elected to the Illinois Senate. He died in Springfield, Illinois.

Notes

Sources
Memoirs of Senator John Davidson

1924 births
2012 deaths
Politicians from Springfield, Illinois
People from West Point, Mississippi
Military personnel from Illinois
Military personnel from Mississippi
American chiropractors
Republican Party Illinois state senators
County board members in Illinois